This is an association football award that recognises the best I-League coach and player each month of the season. It was started in 2019-20 season. Alejandro Menéndez of East Bengal FC and Fran González of Mohun Bagan AC were the first coach and player of December, respectively.

Coach of the month

Winners

Awards won by nationality

Awards won by club

Player of the month

Winner

Awards won by nationality

Awards won by club

References

External links 

 Official website

I-League lists
I-League seasons